Laurence Kelly (born 1933) is an English writer. He was born in Brussels, the son of a diplomat father Sir David Kelly and his wife Marie-Noële (nee de Vaux). He was educated at Downside and New College, Oxford where he got a scholarship to study history. He first visited Moscow in 1950, where his father was serving as the British ambassador. Serving in the Life Guards, he learnt Russian and became an army interpreter. He also served in the Foreign Office in the mid-1950s.

As a writer, he wrote acclaimed biographies of two important Russian figures from the early 19th century: Mikhail Lermontov and Alexander Griboyedov. He won the Cheltenham Prize for Lermontov: Tragedy in the Caucasus. He has also edited literary anthologies on Moscow, St Petersburg and Istanbul. He was married to the historian Linda Kelly who died in 2019.

References

English biographers
1933 births
Living people